Roshchino is a rural locality (a village) in Pekshinskoye Rural Settlement, Petushinsky District, Vladimir Oblast, Russia. The population was 22 as of 2010.

Geography 
Roshchino is located 34 km northeast of Petushki (the district's administrative centre) by road. Volkovo is the nearest rural locality.

References 

Rural localities in Petushinsky District